Outbursts is the fifth studio album by Turin Brakes, the first to appear on their new label, Cooking Vinyl. It was released on 1 March 2010. The first single is "Sea Change".

Track listing

Personnel
 Rob Allum – drums
 Eddy Myer – double bass
 Phil Marten – synth strings
 Tim Baxter – string arrangement
 Danny Keane – cello
 Oli Langford – violin/viola
 Barny Barnicott – mixing
 Frank Arkwright – mastering

Charts

References

2010 albums
Turin Brakes albums